This event was held on Saturday 28 January 2012 as part of the 2012 UCI Cyclo-cross World Championships. Six laps had to be completed, totalling up to 17.72 kilometre.

Ranking

External links
 
 

Men's junior race
UCI Cyclo-cross World Championships – Men's junior race